Goulburn is an electoral district of the Legislative Assembly in the Australian state of New South Wales.  It is represented by Wendy Tuckerman of the Liberal Party.

Goulburn is a regional electorate. It encompasses all of Goulburn Mulwaree Council, Yass Valley Council, Upper Lachlan Shire, the eastern part of Hilltops Council and a large part of Wingecarribee Shire. Its population centres include Goulburn and Yass, as well as Marulan, Tallong, Towrang, Bungonia, Lake Bathurst, Tarago, Moss Vale, Bundanoon, Berrima, Sutton Forest, Exeter, Wingello, Penrose, Taralga, Murrumbateman, Boorowa, Crookwell and Gunning.

History
Goulburn was first established in 1859, partly replacing Southern Boroughs. In 1920, with the introduction of proportional representation, it absorbed Monaro and Bega and elected three members simultaneously.   Monaro and South Coast were separated from it in 1927 and it reverted to a single-member electorate. It was abolished in 1991, but recreated for the 2007 general election from part of the abolished district of Southern Highlands and part of the old Burrinjuck.

Members for Goulburn

2nd incarnation (2007-present)

Election results

References

Goulburn
Goulburn